Migrants' routes cover the main geographical routes from tropical Africa towards Europe taken by people attempting to gain residence and work opportunities unavailable in their home countries.  Although most migrants have Europe as their intended destination, alternative routes are also directed towards South Africa and Asia.

Very few African migrants have European travel visas, therefore their only accessible way northwards is that of traveling along trans-Saharan routes and taking boat journeys across sea barriers. About 10% of the whole migratory stream uses sea routes.

Most African migrants do not succeed in proceeding beyond the coastal regions of North Africa, ending their journeys in one of the Mediterranean coastal countries (especially in Libya and in the Maghreb, where almost 2 million irregular migrants live).

A minority of migrants (between 10 and 15%) continue across the Mediterranean towards Europe facing the dangers of a sea crossing in open boats. The steady stream of migrants has prompted opposition and hostility from North African governments, which have adopted repression and forced repatriation measures. Due to a lack of repatriation agreements, migrants are mainly deported through the southern borders with neighbouring countries (Rosso, near the Mauritania–Senegal border; Oujda, near the Morocco–Algeria border; Tinzouatine and In Guezzam, respectively near Algeria–Mali and Algeria-Niger borders).

New migration routes have developed directly from Sub-Saharan countries (Senegal, Gambia, Guinea coast) creating new entry paths and new migratory strategies (i.e. the increasing number of underages because less exposed to the risk of forced homecoming), which have partially varied the migrants' origins (fewer migrants from Sub-Sahara and more from Egypt and Morocco) but still not reducing the migratory pressure from Libya, which is still the major source of people migrating towards Italy and the main spot of departure for the European dream.

For many migrants who try to cross the various African borders and their complex security, crime, or corruption systems, this is a human odyssey, about which in many cases there are no traces and witnesses. The journey involves considerable expenses (people earning less than 1 Euro per day may spend thousands of Euros for this journey), and is also very hazardous. Mortality during journeys across the desert, the sea or during other stops is a major threat. United Nations High Commission for Refugees, UNHCR, announced that during 2018, at least 50 migrants died trying to cross the Mediterranean. The reasons that prompt people to undertake the journey are mainly economic, for people in search of better living conditions, but also cultural and symbolic (e.g. in Sub-Saharan Africa the journey is mainly meant as a different way of undergoing the traditional rites of passage).

Through the modification of control and repression measures, the Sub-Saharan African migratory process is changing and therefore gradually tracing new maritime and overland routes, typically run by criminal organizations and networks of local go-betweens, which operate by collusion with the law enforcement authorities.

Agadez - Dirkou - Sabha 
This is the first migratory route, which covers the old caravan trail passing by Agadez and Dirkou (in Niger) and the Sabha oasis (in Libya), and was gone through first in the 1990s from a huge migratory stream appealed in Libya by political measures aimed at opening the borders introduced by Muammar Gaddafi in 1992.

In the last years the Libyan migratory policy has been aiming at contrasting the Western embargo  and at supporting the use of Southern foreign workforce in order to overcome the productive lack especially in the field of agriculture and construction. These measures have been blocked after xenophobic reactions occurred in 2000 in Tripoli and Zawiya.

From then onwards, Libya, being the country with the majority of immigrants among the local countries (about 1.5 million immigrants among 5.5 million inhabitants, mainly distributed on the coastal area), aims at restraining and repressing irregular migrants. Libya and its policy have been supported (despite the continuous human rights violations) by the agreements on the control on irregular migrations signed together with the European countries (especially Italy).

Following the widely reported drowning of over 200 migrants traveling from Libya to Europe in March 2009, the Libyan Interior Minister Abdelfattah Yunis al-Obeidi announced an agreement with Nigerien Interior Minister Albadé Abouba to begin joint patrols to stem the flow of migrants through Niger into Libya.  The majority of Sub-Saharan migrants who travel through Libya come by this route.

Agadez - Arlit - Bamako - Gao - Tamanrasset 

From 2000 onwards has been traced a new much more westward oriented route, which gathers the migratory stream moving from Sub-Saharan Africa, which is mostly exposed to conflicts and crisis (such as Nigeria, Côte d'Ivoire, Liberia, Mali, Burkina Faso, Niger, Central African Republic, Cameroon, etc.) as well as the smaller migratory stream coming from Central Asia.

So, nowadays migrants rediscover and go through the old routes of Sub-Saharan caravan networks covered for centuries by nomadic people (Tuareg) from Mali, Niger and Algeria.

The new joints passed through by caravans reshape the urban landscape and many cities, like Agadez and Arlit in Niger, Bamako and Gao in Mali and Tamanrasset in Algeria, are filled with migrants and other people involved in the handling and transporting illegal migrants.
From these junts migrants head especially towards Maghnia on the Moroccan border and the Spanish enclave in Ceuta and Melilla on the coast, where they continuously try to cross the  barriers in defence of the cities or to reach the nearest spots on the Algerian and Tunisian coasts. Between 2000 and 2005 the migratory pressure in Morocco has increased and reached its highest point in summer-autumn 2005, when hundreds of migrants assaulted the barriers of the two Spanish enclaves (Ceuta and Melilla), causing the death of dozens of people and the injure of hundreds of people.

The renewed policy of cooperation between Madrid and Rabat, launched by Government Zapatero in 2004, prompts Moroccan authorities to adopt measures to dissuade and restrain irregular migration, causing a new southward movement of the migratory routes toward the Canary Islands.

Canary Islands 

The third route to the Spanish Canary Islands, off Mauritania, has a long history of irregular migration, which has increased since the 1990s due to the gradual closure of exits to the north.

The new restraining measures on the Mediterranean coasts, following up the agreements between Italy and Spain, are gradually moving the migratory pressure on the maritime route between El Aaiún in Western Sahara and the Canary Islands. This trail lasts almost a night. As time goes by, the fishermen' ships (dugout or pateras) of the Western Sahara, which have been strengthened with more powerful engines and therefore are more and more crowded with irregular migrants, are forced to start their journey from coastal spots more and more far-away from El Aaiún route. On the other hand, the restrictions adopted on the Mauritanian and Moroccan coasts deter fishermen from attempting this long journey and the starting points are no longer the Western- Saharan ones, but they become southward oriented, including the coasts of Senegal, Gambia and Gulf of Guinea.

The economic costs and the losses of human lives during the passage to the West and the resulting exploitation processes are due to the increase in distance and to the risks of the transfer. Migrants, helped by a compass and little information on the driving of a boat, are in charge of leading it and this behaviour considerably increases the risks of the transfer. This also leads to an increasing number of castaways on the Atlantic coasts.

See also
Emigration from Africa
to Europe
to Latin America
to the United States

Notes

References
 Gabriele Del Grande, Mamadou va a morire. La strage dei clandestini nel Mediterraneo, Roma, Infinito Edizioni, 2007.
 A. Bensaâd, Voyage avec les clandestins du Sahel in "Le Monde Diplomatiques", septembre 2001: 16-17.
 A. Bensaâd, Agadez, carrefour migratoire sahélo-maghrébin in "Revue Européenne des Migrations Internationales", vol. 19, n. 1, 2007: 7-28.
 J. Brachet, Migrations transsahariennes. Vers un désert cosmopolite et morcelé (Niger), Paris : éditions du Croquant, 2009.
 J. Brachet, The Blind Spot of Repression: Migration Policies and Human Survival in the Central Sahara, in T.-D. Truong and D. Gasper (eds), Transnational Migration and Human Security. The Migration-Development-Security Nexus, Berlin-New York : Springer, 2011, 57-66.
 Caritas e Migrantes, XVI Rapporto sull’immigrazione, Roma, Idos, 2006.
 J.-P. Cassarino, The EU Return Policy: Premises and Implications, Mirem [Migration de retour au Maghreb] Project, European University Institute, 2006.
 CISP-SARP, Profils des migrants subsahariens en situation irregulière en Algérie, Alger, mars 2007.
 CESPI/SID, European Migration Policies towards Africa. Trends, Impact, and Outlook, Part I, Cespi Working Paper n. 24, 2006.
 Lorenzo Coslovi, Spagna e Italia nel tragico domino degli sbarchi in "Limes", n. 4, 2007:227-236.
 H. De Haas, Trans-Saharan Migration to North Africa and the EU: Historical Roots and Current Trends, Migration Information Source, novembre 2006.
 Sandro De Luca, Le vie sahariane per l'Europa sono infinite in "Limes", n. 4, 2007:217-226
 European Commission, Technical Mission to Libya on Illegal Immigration, Report, 27/11-06/12/2004.
 Francesco Forgiane, La mano delle mafie sui nuovi schiavi in "Limes", n. 4, 2007: 157-160.
 E. Godschmidt, Storming the Fences: Morocco and Europe's Anti-Migration Policy in "Middle East Report Online", n. 239, Summer 2006.
 M. A. Gomez, Reversing Sail. A History of the African Diaspora, Cambridge University Press, Cambridge, 2005.
 M. Lahlou, Guardiani o partner? Il ruolo degli stati del Maghreb nella gestione delle migrazioni africane verso l'Europa, Cespi Working Paper n. 24, 2006
 Ferruccio Pastore, La paranoia dell’invasione e il futuro dell’Italia in "Limes", n. 4, 2007: 25-33.
 Bruno Riccio, Emigrare, immigrare, transmigrare in "Afriche e orienti", n. 3-4, 2000: 4-40.
 A. Triulzi e M. Carsetti, Ascoltare voci migranti: riflessioni intorno alle memorie di rifugiati dal Corno d'Africa in "Afriche e Orienti", n. 1, 2007, 96-115.
 E. Vitale, Ius migrandi. Figure di erranti al di qua della cosmopoli, Bollati Boringhieri, Torino, 2004.
 A. S. Wender, Gourougou, Bel Younes, Oujda. La situation allarmante des migrants subsahariens en transita au Maroc et les conséquences des politiques de l'Union Européenne in "Cimade", October 2004.

African society
Immigration to Europe
Immigration to Africa